Ruxandra Basarab (died 1545) was a Romanian princess. She was a princess consort of Wallachia by marriage to Radu Paisie. 

She married first Radu of Afumați, Voivode of Wallachia, and second Radu Paisie, Prince of Wallachia.

References 

 Marcu, George (coord.) - Dicționarul personalităților feminine din România, Editura Meronia, Bucharest, 2009.

Year of birth unknown
1545 deaths
16th-century Romanian women
Royal consorts of Wallachia